Bjarne Lindstrøm (born 3 June 1942) is a Norwegian diplomat.

He started working for the Norwegian Ministry of Foreign Affairs in 1962. He was the consul-general in Cape Town, South Africa from 1986 to 1990, deputy under-secretary of state in the Ministry of Foreign Affairs from 1994 to 1996, permanent under-secretary of state in the Ministry of Foreign Affairs from 1996 to 2005, and Norwegian ambassador to the United Kingdom from 2005 to 2010.

References

1942 births
Living people
Norwegian civil servants
Ambassadors of Norway to the United Kingdom
Norwegian expatriates in South Africa
Norwegian expatriates in the United Kingdom
Recipients of the Order of the Cross of Terra Mariana, 1st Class